Lebanese people in Iran refers to Lebanese living in Iran or Iranians of Lebanese descent. The Lebanese populate various regions and cities, but historically the religious city of Qom (apart from the modern capital Tehran and previous capitals) has been a principal area of settlement.

Lebanese are known to have been steadily migrating to the contemporary and former territories of Iran since the Safavid-era.

History
Lebanese are known to have been migrating to contemporary Iran since the time of the Safavids (1501-1736). Nur-al-Din Karaki Ameli, a principal Lebanese Shia scholar, played a pivotal role at the Safavid court in opening a new way in the relations between secular rulers and Shi'ite clerics. Karaki furthermore played a crucial role in inaugurating a movement of emigration of Lebanese Shia scholars from Jabal Amel (then in Ottoman Syria) to Safavid Iran during the reign of the first two Safavid kings (shahs), namely Ismail I (r. 1501-24) and Tahmasp I (r. 1524-76), who were at pains to introduce Shi'ism on the state-level throughout their vast dominions. At the beginning of the Safavid era, Twelver Shi'ism was imported into Iran largely from Mount Lebanon and Syria.

Notable Iranians of Lebanese descent
 Nur-al-Din Karaki ʿĀmeli
 Moḥammad b. Ḥasan Ḥorr ʿĀmeli
 Bahāʾ al-dīn al-ʿĀmilī
 Musa al-Sadr

See also
 Lebanon-Iran relations
 Arab diaspora
 Lebanese diaspora
 Iranian Arabs
 Safavid conversion of Iran to Shia Islam
 Iranians in Lebanon
 Shia Islam in Lebanon
 Shia Islam in Iran

References

Ethnic groups in Iran
Iran
 
Iran